The Regional Bond Dealers Association (RBDA) is the predominant U.S. trade association focused on representing regional and middle-market securities firms active in the fixed income markets.  The RBDA is headquartered in Washington, DC, USA.

Formation 

The RBDA was formed in March 2008 by 14 firms.  The RBDA's stated mission is to "work to advocate public policies and market practices aimed at improving the market environment" and to "provide a forum for its members to discuss and debate issues of common interest."

Leadership and Members 

The RBDA is led by a 15-member board of directors.  As of October 2008, board members include:

Mark Medford (Chair), Vining Sparks
Kenneth Williams (Vice Chair), Stone & Youngberg LLC
Silas Matthies (Treasurer-Secretary), Wells Fargo Brokerage Services LLC
Miles Benickes, M.L. Stern & Co.
Jeff Chapman, Fifth Third Securities
Jay Hiniker, Cronin & Co., Inc.
Dan Leland, Southwest Securities
Michael Marz, First Southwest Company
Mike Newhouse, Seattle-Northwest Securities Corp.
Demetri Patikas, Duncan - Williams, Inc.
Alan Polsky, Dougherty & Company LLC
Marc Porter, G.X. Clarke & Co.
Tom Ricketts, Incapital LLC
Don Winton, Crews & Associates, Inc.

Executive staff of the RBDA includes Chief Executive Officer Mike Nicholas.

In addition to firms represented on the board of directors, membership in the RBDA includes Coastal Securities, Inc., Comerica Securities, D.A. Davidson and Co., FTN Financial, Oppenheimer & Co. and Raymond James & Associates.  Associate members include Broadridge Financial, MarketAxess and TheMuniCenter.

References

External links 
RBDA Web site

Securities (finance)
Bond market
Finance industry associations
Trade associations based in the United States